Matthew Bryant (born 21 September 1970) is an English-born former professional footballer who played as a midfielder in the Football League in the 1990s.

Born in Bristol, he started his career with Bristol City in 1990-91, and after a short loan spell with Walsall went on to make over 200 appearances for Bristol City, scoring 7 goals for them in all competitions.

In August 1990, during his loan spell at Walsall, he had the misfortune of scoring an own goal which was the first ever league goal scored at the Bescot Stadium.

Bryant moved to Gillingham for the 1996-97 season, making over 100 appearances for them before retiring due to injury.

References

1970 births
Living people
Association football defenders
English Football League players
Bristol City F.C. players
Walsall F.C. players
Gillingham F.C. players
Gloucester City A.F.C. players
Footballers from Bristol
English footballers